Rajadurai or Rajathurai is a Tamil male given name. Due to the Tamil tradition of using patronymic surnames it may also be a surname for males and females.

Notable people

Given name
 C. Rajadurai (born 1927), Ceylonese politician

Surname
 Brian Rajadurai (born 1965), Canadian cricketer
 Perumal Rajadurai (born 1967), Sri Lankan lawyer and politician
 Sivanandi Rajadurai (born 1951), Indian scientist

Other uses
 Rajadurai (film), 1993 Tamil film

See also
 
 

Tamil masculine given names